Cerro Bonete is a mountain in the north of the province of La Rioja, Argentina, near the provincial border with Catamarca. Its summit is 6,759 m above mean sea level, making it the fifth-highest separate mountain in the Americas (after Aconcagua, Ojos del Salado, Monte Pissis, and Huascaran).  SRTM data disproves the frequently-made claim that its summit is 6,872 m above sea level.

Within the last 3.5 million years, volcanic activity at Cerro Bonete has formed lava domes of dacite and rhyodacite.

See also 
 Incapillo

References

External links 
 Cerro Bonete on summitpost
 Cordillera de los Andes

Bonete
Lava domes
Volcanoes of Argentina
Six-thousanders of the Andes